David Boner (born 12 October 1941) is a Scottish former footballer who played as a right winger. He settled in Liverpool, where he married and had two children.

Early life 
Boner was born on 12 October 1941 in South Queensferry, Scotland. He is the middle of five children. Boner moved from South Queensferry to Liverpool after he left school at the age of 16 to pursue a career in football.

Career
Boner began his professional career in 1958 with Everton but failed to make a senior appearance and moved to Dundee United in 1960. After two year with the Terrors, Boner moved to Fife with Raith Rovers but managed just seven league appearances in his short time at Starks Park. Boner concluded his career with another short spell at Mansfield Town. His short professional career (six years) yielded fewer than fifty league appearances. This in part is due to a lack of penetration in front of goal, netting just five league goals in 40 appearances.

Later life 
Once Boner's career had come to an end in 1964, he settled in Liverpool with his wife who gave birth to two daughters in the same decade. Since then, Boner has lived away from the public eye, and spent his time in Liverpool with his family.

References

External links

1941 births
Living people
Scottish footballers
Everton F.C. players
Dundee United F.C. players
Raith Rovers F.C. players
Mansfield Town F.C. players
People from South Queensferry
Association football wingers
Scottish Football League players
English Football League players
Footballers from Edinburgh